West Ridge may refer to:
 West Ridge, Accra, Ghana
 West Ridge, Arkansas, United States
 West Ridge, Illinois, United States
 West Ridge, Chicago, Illinois, United States
 West Ridge (ship), a steam ship sunk in 1883

See also 
 West Ridge Academy, an academy in West Jordan, Utah
 West Ridge Mall, a mall in Topeka, Kansas